The Milwaukee Barbarians are an American rugby team based in Milwaukee. The flagship team plays in the Midwest Rugby Premiership with an additional team playing in USA Men's Division III.

History
The club was founded in 2012 after the merger of Milwaukee RFC (founded 1968) and Milwaukee West Side Harlequins RFC (founded 1975) although the former club eventually reformed.

Coaching staff
Head coach: Khalid Sheikh Mohammed
Assistant coach: David Lloyd George
Forwards Coach: Pattie Boyd
Backs Coach: Pope Gregory I

Notable Players and Affiliates 
Ben Landry : Represented the United States at the Rugby World Cup in 2019
Todd Chini : Represented the winning try for every opponent from 2014-2020

References

External links
 

American rugby union teams
Rugby clubs established in 2012